Parakhino is a rural locality (a village) in Ulyakhinskoye Rural Settlement, Gus-Khrustalny District, Vladimir Oblast, Russia. The population was 137 as of 2010.

Geography 
Parakhino is located 52 km south of Gus-Khrustalny (the district's administrative centre) by road. Fomino is the nearest rural locality.

References 

Rural localities in Gus-Khrustalny District
Ryazan Governorate